Atonement is the third studio album by Final Cut, released on May 28, 1996 by Fifth Colvmn Records.

Reception

Aiding & Abetting gave Atonement a positive review, saying  "The Final Cut takes the best ideas of the world's finest industrial purveyors, adding a few new ideas just for the hell of it." AllMusic awarded the album two and a half out of five stars and said "while the results fit snugly into 1990s industrial territory, the record is also strongly influenced by the blaxploitation-styled guitar funk of the 1970s." Sonic Boom gave the album a mixed review, saying "musically this EP is all over the place. It ranges from the very traditional guitar, drums, bass of CSC to club remixes almost totally devoid of a guitar" and "If you are either a CSC or Meathead completist you will want to pick up this EP which has tracks that appear nowhere else."

Track listing

Personnel
Adapted from the Hands of Ash liner notes.

Additional performers
 Greg Lucas- guitars,samplers
 Martin Atkins]] – drums (1)
 Beth – backing vocals (6)
 Chris Connelly – vocals (8)
 Tyree Davis – percussion (2, 3)
 Dena – backing vocals (6)
 Taime Downe – guitar (2)
 Hobie Echlin – bass guitar (1)
 JC – vocals (2, 4, 5)
 Kurt Komraus – instruments
 Anthony Srock – mixing
 Louis Svitek – guitar (4, 5)
 Matt Warren – programming

Production and design
 Tom Baker – mastering
 Van Christie – engineering, mixing, editing
 Zalman Fishman – executive-producer
 Sean Joyce – assistant engineering
 Jim Marcus – engineering, typography, design
 Stephen Moore – assistant engineering
 Jason McNinch – editing
 Rex Ritter – photography
 Anthony Srock – mixing, editing

Release history

References

External links 
 

1996 albums
Fifth Colvmn Records albums
Final Cut (band) albums